Aaron Johnston is an American author, comics writer, and film producer.

Johnston was an associate producer on the movie Ender's Game, including a cameo appearance as an International Fleet officer. He co-authored with Orson Scott Card the First Formic War trilogy, a prequel series to Ender's Game. The series includes Earth Unaware, Earth Afire, and Earth Awakens.

His second pre Ender series includes The Swarm and The Hive. These are concluded with the final tales of the second Formic war relayed in The Queens, setting the stage for Orson Scott Card’s Enders Game series and the third Formic war.

His comic credits for Marvel comics include Ender in Exile, Speaker for the Dead, Formic Wars, League War, and Mazer in Prison.

He is a writer for BYUtv's original series Extinct and provides the voice for Blue Drone in the series.

His play Lifeloop is an adaptation of Orson Scott Card's short story.

Johnston is a Mormon. He first met Card when he was in the same LDS stake as him in North Carolina.

Bibliography

Novels

Comics

Filmography

Notes

Sources
About Aaron - aaronwjohnston.com
AARON JOHNSTON – MacMillan

External links
Aaron Johnston - IMDB

Living people
Latter Day Saints from North Carolina
American comics writers
American fantasy writers
Place of birth missing (living people)
Year of birth missing (living people)
American male novelists
American science fiction writers